The Naguib Mahfouz Medal for Literature is a literary award for Arabic literature. It is given to the best contemporary novel written in Arabic, but not available in English translation. The winning book is then translated into English, and published by American University in Cairo Press. It was first awarded in 1996 and is presented annually on December 11, the birthday of Nobel laureate Naguib Mahfouz, by the President of the American University in Cairo.

2011 was a unique year for the award because of the 2011 Egyptian revolution. The campuses of the American University in Cairo were operationally impacted and instead of presenting no award, AUCP gave the award to "the revolutionary creativity of the Egyptian people during the popular uprising that began on 25 January 2011."

Winners
Previous winners.
 1996: Ibrahim Abdel Meguid, The Other Place; and Latifa al-Zayyat, The Open Door
 1997: Mourid Barghouti, I Saw Ramallah; and Yusuf Idris, City of Love and Ashes
 1998: Ahlam Mosteghanemi, Memory in the Flesh
 1999: Edwar al-Kharrat, Rama and the Dragon
 2000: Hoda Barakat, The Tiller of Waters
 2001: Somaya Ramadan, Leaves of Narcissus
 2002: Bensalem Himmich, The Polymath
 2003: Khairy Shalaby, The Lodging House
 2004: Alia Mamdouh, The Loved Ones
 2005: Yusuf Abu Rayya, Wedding Night
 2006: Sahar Khalifeh, The Image, the Icon, and the Covenant
 2007: Amina Zaydan, Red Wine
 2008: Hamdi Abu Golayyel, A Dog with No Tail
 2009: Khalil Sweileh, The Scribe of Love
 2010: Miral al-Tahawy, Brooklyn Heights 2011: Awarded to "the revolutionary creativity of the Egyptian people"
 2012: Ezzat el Kamhawi, House of the Wolf 2013: Khaled Khalifa, No Knives in this City's Kitchens 2014: Hammour Ziada, Shawq al-darwish (The Longing of the Dervish)
 2015: Hassan Daoud, La Tareeq Ila Al-Jannah ('No Road to Paradise')
 2016: Adel Esmat, Hikayat Yusuf Tadrus ('The Tales of Yusuf Tadrus', 'حكايات يوسف تادرس') 
 2017: Huzama Habayeb, (Velvet'', 'مُخْمَل')
 2018: Omaima Al-Khamis, ('Voyage of the Cranes in the Cities of Agate', 'مسرى الغرانيق في مدن العقيق')
 2021: Ahmed Taibaoui, The Disappearance of Mr. Nobody

References

External links
 Naguib Mahfouz Medal for Literature, official website.

Translation awards
Arabic literary awards
Awards established in 1996
Egyptian literary awards